The Thorndon Mile (formally WRC George Adams Handicap) is a Group One (G1) Thoroughbred horse race contested at Trentham Racecourse by the Wellington Racing Club. 

The race is run on Wellington Cup day, traditionally the last Saturday of January.

This race was known as the WRC George Adams Handicap until 1983. It was also known as the Jarden Mile or Jarden Morgan Mile while sponsored by that organisation over the 1984-1991 period. Later sponsors have included Hutt Valley Cartage.

Notable winners

The Thorndon Mile has been won by many of the best horses in New Zealand, such as:

 Alamosa, winner of the 2007 ARC Diamond Stakes and the 2008 Otaki-Maori Weight for Age and Toorak Handicap. Also sire of Kirramosa, winner of the 2013 VRC Oaks.
 Grey Way
 Kawi, winner of seven Group One races 
 McGinty
 Melody Belle
 Sir Slick
 Wall Street, winner of the 2010 Windsor Park Plate, Spring Classic and Emirates Stakes

Race results

See also

 Recent winners of major Wellington and other New Zealand races
 Desert Gold Stakes (raced on same day)
 Telegraph Handicap
 Captain Cook Stakes

References

 N.Z. Thoroughbred Racing Inc.
 http://www.racenet.com.au
 http://www.nzracing.co.nz
 http://www.tab.co.nz
 http://www.racebase.co.nz
 The Great Decade of New Zealand racing 1970-1980. Glengarry, Jack. William Collins Publishers Ltd, Wellington, New Zealand.
 New Zealand Thoroughbred Racing Annual 2018 (47th edition). Dennis Ryan, Editor, Racing Media NZ Limited, Auckland, New Zealand.
 New Zealand Thoroughbred Racing Annual 2017 (46th edition). Dennis Ryan, Editor, Racing Media NZ Limited, Auckland, New Zealand.
 New Zealand Thoroughbred Racing Annual 2008 (37th edition). Bradford, David, Editor.  Bradford Publishing Limited, Paeroa, New Zealand.
 New Zealand Thoroughbred Racing Annual 2005 (34th edition). Bradford, David, Editor.  Bradford Publishing Limited, Paeroa, New Zealand.
 New Zealand Thoroughbred Racing Annual 2004 (33rd edition). Bradford, David, Editor.  Bradford Publishing Limited, Paeroa, New Zealand.
 New Zealand Thoroughbred Racing Annual 2000 (29th edition). Bradford, David, Editor.  Bradford Publishing Limited, Auckland, New Zealand.
 New Zealand Thoroughbred Racing Annual 1997  (26th edition). Dillon, Mike, Editor. Mike Dillon's Racing Enterprises Ltd, Auckland, New Zealand.
 New Zealand Thoroughbred Racing Annual 1995 (24th edition). Dillon, Mike, Editor. Mike Dillon's Racing Enterprises Ltd, Auckland, New Zealand.
 New Zealand Thoroughbred Racing Annual 1994 (23rd edition). Dillon, Mike, Editor. Meadowset Publishing, Auckland, New Zealand.
 New Zealand Thoroughbred Racing Annual 1991  (20th edition). Dillon, Mike, Editor. Moa Publications, Auckland, New Zealand.
 New Zealand Thoroughbred Racing Annual 1987 (16th edition). Dillon, Mike, Editor. Moa Publications, Auckland, New Zealand.
 New Zealand Thoroughbred Racing Annual 1985 (Fourteenth edition). Costello, John, Editor. Moa Publications, Auckland, New Zealand.
 New Zealand Thoroughbred Racing Annual 1984 (Thirteenth edition). Costello, John, Editor. Moa Publications, Auckland, New Zealand.
 New Zealand Thoroughbred Racing Annual 1982 (Eleventh edition). Costello, John, Editor. Moa Publications, Auckland, New Zealand.
 New Zealand Thoroughbred Racing Annual 1981 (Tenth edition). Costello, John, Editor. Moa Publications, Auckland, New Zealand.
 New Zealand Thoroughbred Racing Annual 1980 (Ninth edition). Costello, John, Editor. Moa Publications, Auckland, New Zealand.
 New Zealand Thoroughbred Racing Annual 1979 (Eighth edition).Costello, John, Editor. Moa Publications, Auckland, New Zealand.
 New Zealand Thoroughbred Racing Annual 1978 (Seventh edition).Costello, John, Editor. Moa Publications, Auckland, New Zealand.
 New Zealand Thoroughbred Racing Annual 1976. Costello, John, Editor. Moa Publications, Auckland.

Horse racing in New Zealand
Sport in Wellington
Horse races in New Zealand